Arystanbek Muhamediuly (Arystanbek Mūhamediūly; born 11 February 1963) is a Kazakh politician who served as a Minister of Culture and Sports from 11 March 2014 to 17 June 2019. He's currently the director of the National Museum of the Republic of Kazakhstan.

Muhamediuly is author of a number of musical works, such as: marches for a brass band, Bahyt Asy and Jastar waltz compositions,, songs such as Astana, Asyl sezim, and Dostarym, as well as publications on cultural issues and arts.

Early life and education 
Muhamediuly was born in the village of Tuzdybastau in Almaty Region. He graduated from the Kazakh National Conservatory in 1986 and in 1997, from the Academy of Public Administration. In 2001, Muhamediuly completed graduate school in the Al-Farabi Kazakh National University. In 2003, he defended his Ph.D. thesis on the topic: "Kazakhstan-Unesco: aspects of cultural cooperation".

Career 
Muhamediuly began his career in 1984 as a philharmonic artist in the Jambyl Kazakh State Philharmonic. In 1991, he became a chief specialist in the Ministry of Culture where he served as an assistant from 1993. In 1994, Muhamediuly became the director of the Gulder Sate Ensemble. From 1997 to 2001, he served as the head of the Presidential Orchestra before becoming the General Director of the Directorate of Republican and International Cultural Programs.

From 2005, Muhamediuly was the President of the Joint Stock Company Kazakh Kuenderі until he was appointed as a Vice Minister of Culture and Information in April 2006. In March 2007, he became the chief inspector of the Domestic Policy Sector of the Administration of the President of the Republic of Kazakhstan. From February to April 2008, Muhamediuly served as the head of the Sector of the Internal Policy Department of the Administration of the President of the Republic of Kazakhstan before becoming the rector of the Kazakh National Academy of Arts.

On 11 March 2014, Muhamediuly was appointed as a Minister of Culture. He served the post before being appointed on 6 August 2014 as Minister of Culture and Sports. During his tenure, he was criticized on several occasions such as agreeing with President Nursultan Nazarbayev for saying how Kazakhs are living in their best times of the 550 year history and how it was his work that the nation gained its independence in 1991. He was also criticized for inappropriate remarks about movies "shaming Kazakhstan” and “Kyrgyz washing toilets”. In 2016, several women accused Muhamediuly of sexual harassment. On 17 June 2019, by the Decree of the President of Kazakhstan, Muhamediuly was relieved from his post after serving for almost five years.

Since 10 July 2019, he has been the director of the National Museum of the Republic of Kazakhstan in Nur-Sultan.

On May 16, 2022, the Anti-Corruption Service reported that Arystanbek Mukhamediuly was arrested on suspicion of embezzlement of budget funds. According to the agency, a pre-trial investigation is being conducted against officials of the RSE National Museum of the Republic of Kazakhstan of the Ministry of Culture and Sports on the grounds of embezzlement of budget funds. In the same month, the official attempted suicide while he was in a temporary detention facility.

Personal life 
Muhamediuly is married to Nalia Iskakova and has two sons and one daughter. 

On 5 January 2020, his mother, Kulimkan Tulendieva, died.

References 

1963 births
Living people
People from Almaty Region
Government ministers of Kazakhstan